Pedro de Lisperguer was a German conquistador from Worms who participated in the Conquest of Chile. He is the patriarch of a highly influential family in Colonial Chile. He arrived to Chile in the 1550s after Emperor Charles V authorized him to depart from Peru. Catalina de los Ríos y Lisperguer was his granddaughter.

References

German conquistadors
German emigrants to Chile
People from Worms, Germany